Sodium selenide is an inorganic compound of sodium and selenium with the chemical formula Na2Se.

Preparation
This colourless solid is prepared by the reaction of selenium with a solution of sodium in liquid ammonia at −40 °C. Alternatively, sodium selenide can be prepared by the reaction of gaseous hydrogen selenide with metallic sodium at 100 °C.

Reactions
Like other alkali metal chalcogenides, this material is highly sensitive to water, easily undergoing hydrolysis to give mixtures of sodium biselenide (NaSeH) and hydroxide. This hydrolysis occurs because of the extreme basicity of the Se2− ion.

Na2Se + H2O → NaHSe + NaOH

Similarly, sodium selenide is readily oxidized to polyselenides, a conversion signaled by off-white samples.

Sodium selenide reacts with acids to produce toxic hydrogen selenide gas.

Na2Se + 2 HCl → H2Se + 2 NaCl

The compound reacts with electrophiles to produce the selenium compounds.  With alkyl halides, one obtains a variety of organoselenium compounds:
Na2Se  +  2 RBr   →   R2Se  +  2 NaBr

Organotin and organosilicon halides react similarly to give the expected derivatives:
Na2Se  +  2 Me3XCl   →   (Me3X)2Se  +  2 NaCl  (X ∈ Si, Ge, Sn)

References

Sodium compounds
Selenides
Fluorite crystal structure